Ghulam Abbas  (born 1 May 1947) is a former Pakistani cricketer who played in one Test match in 1967.

Born in an Urdu-speaking family, Abbas was educated at Government Boys Secondary School and Islamia College, Karachi.

References

1947 births
Living people
Cricketers from Karachi
Pakistan Test cricketers
Karachi cricketers
National Bank of Pakistan cricketers
Pakistan International Airlines cricketers
International Cavaliers cricketers
Pakistani cricketers
Cricketers from Delhi
Karachi B cricketers
Karachi Blues cricketers
Karachi Whites cricketers
Pakistan International Airlines A cricketers
South Zone (Pakistan) cricketers
Muhajir people